"Blame Game" is a 2010 song by Kanye West.

Blame Game or The Blame Game may also refer to:

Music
Blame Game (EP), by Beach Bunny, 2021
"Blame Game", a song by the Von Bondies from their 2009 album Love, Hate and Then There's You

Television
The Blame Game (British TV programme), 2005 
The Blame Game (American game show), 1999 
"Blame Game" (Dallas), an episode from the TV series

See also
Buck passing, or (playing) the blame game, the act of attributing to another person or group one's own responsibility